W biały dzień is a Polish historical film. It was released in 1981.

References

External links
 

1981 films
Films set in 1905
Polish historical films
1980s Polish-language films
1980s historical films